Founded in 1888, Parkdale Collegiate Institute is a public high school located on Jameson Avenue in Parkdale, Toronto, Ontario, Canada. It is located in the heart of what is considered 'Little Tibet', which is the home of the largest concentration of Tibetans in the city.

History

Parkdale High School opened in the Masonic Hall on Dowling Avenue in 1888. When the town of Parkdale was annexed to the City of Toronto a year later in 1889, Parkdale High School moved to its new residence on Jameson Avenue where it became the Jameson Avenue Collegiate Institute, and later the Jameson Collegiate Institute. In 1910, the school was renamed to its present name of Parkdale Collegiate Institute. The original building served until 1928 and then demolished while the school moved to the present Collegiate Gothic structure which was completed in 1929. The school has had two additions, the most recent in the 1960s. Parkdale Collegiate Institute is one of the oldest secondary schools in the City of Toronto. 

Parkdale Collegiate Institute is a certified International Baccalaureate World School which began in April 2007.  It currently offers the IB Preparation Programs for Grade 9 and 10 and the IB Diploma Programme for Grade 11 and 12. The current head of the department for the IB program at Parkdale Collegiate Institute is Miroslaw Bartnik. 

One of the first teachers was Nellie Spence, one of the first female secondary school teachers in Toronto, who taught English and History at Parkdale from 1888 until she retired in 1929. The Nellie Spence Archive Room in the school containing memorabilia and local history is named after her.

Parkdale has a rich history of athletics.  This years Senior Girls Volleyball team were the Toronto AA representatives at OFSAA.
The Senior Boys Volleyball team were the Toronto AA representatives at OFSAA for the 2014–2015 season which was held in Northern Ontario.

In the 1976 Summer Olympic Games in Montreal, three Parkdalians participated as members of the Canadian Olympic team, Marvin Nash in the 100 metres, Bishop Dolegiewicz in discus and George Tintor in rowing.

On October 29, 2021, a teacher at Parkdale Collegiate generated controversy after wearing blackface makeup for Halloween while teaching.

Notable alumni
 Stella Asling-Riis - novelist and clubwoman
 Paul Augustus Bridle - Canadian diplomat
 Bonnie Dobson - folk singer, 1960s and 70s
 Fred Gardiner - lawyer and politician; first chairman of Metropolitan Toronto
 Grace Irwin - novelist and teacher
William Krehm - political revolutionary in the 1930s, Time magazine correspondent for Latin America in the 1940s, and Toronto property developer from the 1950s until the 1990s.
 Faisal Kutty - lawyer and law professor
 Mandy Lam - actress 
 Anne Mroczkowski - TV reporter and news anchor
 Goody Rosen - Major League Baseball All-Star outfielder
 Charles Templeton - cartoonist, evangelist, agnostic, politician, newspaper editor, inventor, broadcaster and author

See also
List of high schools in Ontario

References

External links
 TDSB Parkdale CI page
 School web site
 Alumni web site
 Facebook

High schools in Toronto
Schools in the TDSB
Educational institutions established in 1888
1888 establishments in Ontario